Fernando Sebastián Aguilar CMF (14 December 1929 – 24 January 2019) was a Spanish cardinal of the Roman Catholic Church and the Archbishop Emeritus of Pamplona y Tudela.  Pope Francis created him a cardinal in a consistory of February 22, 2014.

Biography and Education
Sebastián  Aguilar was born in Calatayud, Province of Zaragoza on 14 December 1929.

He entered the Congregation of the Missionary Sons of the Immaculate Heart of Mary (Claretians) and made his religious profession on 8 September 1946. After completing his studies in philosophy and theology in the seminaries of the congregation, he was ordained a priest on 28 June 1953. Sebastián Aguilar obtained a doctorate in Sacred Theology from the Pontifical University of St. Thomas Aquinas, ''Angelicum in 1957 with a dissertation entitled “Maternitatis divinae diversa ratio apud Didacum Alvarez et Franciscum Suarez”.

He was a member of the Sociedad Mariológica Española (1959) and director of the Revista Ephemerides Mariologicae (1966). In 1966, he founded the Iglesia Viva journal which he directed until 1971.
He taught dogmatic theology in his religious congregation in Valls and Salamanca. He then served as professor, from 1967, and subsequently rector, from 1971 to 1979, of the Pontifical University of Salamanca.

Episcopate

Sebastián Aguilar was the archbishop emeritus of Pamplona y Tudela, having been archbishop from 26 March 1993 until 31 July 2007, when he was succeeded by Francisco Pérez González. Previously, he was bishop of León from 22 August 1979 until 28 July 1983 when he stepped down. He became archbishop co-adjutor of Granada on 8 April 1988, but did not succeed to that see because he was appointed to the aforementioned Pamplona y Tudela.

Cardinal

Pope Francis announced on 12 January 2014 that on 22 February the archbishop, along with 18 others, would be inducted into the College of Cardinals.

Death
Sebastián Aguilar died on 24 January 2019 in Málaga at the age of 89 after having suffered a severe stroke just a few days prior on 20 January.

See also
Cardinals created by Francis

References

External links

 
Fernando Sebastián Aguilar

 

|-
 

|-
 

1929 births
2019 deaths
21st-century Roman Catholic archbishops in Spain
Bishops of León
People from Calatayud
Cardinals created by Pope Francis
21st-century Spanish cardinals
Claretian cardinals
Pontifical University of Saint Thomas Aquinas alumni
20th-century Roman Catholic archbishops in Spain